Zammara is a genus of cicadas. These species are large cicadas that are generally bright blue-green in color. Like other cicadas, these can produce loud calls; Zammara tympanum, for example, makes a "winding up-like pulsating buzz." Zammara are found in the Neotropics, especially in equatorial regions, where they live in tropical forest habitat. The genus is characterized by tarsi (the "feet" of the insect) that are divided into 2 segments, or tarsomeres; other genera in the tribe have 3 tarsomeres in each tarsus.

There are about 15 or 16 species in the genus.

Species include:
Zammara brevis
Zammara calochroma
Zammara erna
Zammara eximia
Zammara hertha
Zammara intricata
Zammara lichyi
Zammara luculenta
Zammara medialinea
Zammara nigriplaga
Zammara olivacea
Zammara smaragdina
Zammara smaragdula
Zammara strepens
Zammara tympanum

References

Zammarini
Cicadidae genera